St John the Divine, Kennington, is an Anglican church in London. The parish of Kennington is within the Anglican Diocese of Southwark. The church was designed by the architect George Edmund Street (who also built the Royal Courts of Justice on Strand, London) in the Decorated Gothic style, and was built between 1871 and 1874. Today it is a grade I listed building.

The church stands on Vassall Road, Kennington, in Vassall Ward in the London Borough of Lambeth. It is near Oval tube station and the Oval Cricket Ground. The spire can be seen clearly for miles around.

Architecture

The church is regarded as a fine example of Victorian Gothic. The general construction is of red brick, but all parapets, window openings, doorways, etc. are dressed with stone. The upper part of the spire is entirely of stone. At over 260 feet, it is the tallest spire in south London and can be seen for miles around. The poet John Betjeman remarked that St John the Divine was "the most magnificent church in South London."

The original church interior was designed by George Frederick Bodley (Founder of Watts & Co.), and was fitted out in a highly ornate style typical of the Victorian era and of Anglo-Catholic churches, including stone carvings by Thomas Earp, wrought iron altar rails, stained glass windows, and a carved reredos painted by Clayton and Bell. A new organ by J. W. Walker & Sons Ltd was installed in 1875.

The church suffered severe bomb damage in 1941 during the Blitz, and most of the original interior fittings were lost. After years of restoration work under the direction of H. S. Goodhart-Rendel, St John the Divine re-opened in September 1958.

The tower and gargoyles
The spire and tower were extensively restored in 1994, and a new set of carved grotesques and gargoyles was added. Many of the carvings are in the form of caricature representations of members of the church congregation, the British Royal Family or the clergy. The Queen, Prince Charles, Prince William and Archbishop Michael Ramsey are among the better-known figures depicted.

Stained glass
Much of the original stained glass was destroyed in the 1941 bombing, and it has been replaced with plain glass windows in the north and south aisles. Some original stained glass designed by Charles Eamer Kempe has survived, including the west window and two windows in the south aisle. The windows at the east end are also original.

During restoration, new windows designed and crafted by W. T. Carter Shapland were installed in the All Souls Chapel.

Murals
Behind the altar is a set of murals painted by Brian Thomas in 1966. The left-hand panel depicts the Virgin Mary and Jesus in a floral garden. A central panel is decorated with lilies and roses – traditional Marian symbols. The right-hand panel is a pietà, with Mary holding the body of the crucified Christ, and instead of a floral border it is framed with thorns, representing the Crown of Thorns.

The Korean Icon
Above the North door hangs the 'Korean Icon'. Designed in the style of a Greek Orthodox iconostasis, it depicts various figures from the Christian Gospels. It was dedicated as a memorial to Bishop Charles John Corfe, who founded the Anglican Church of Korea in 1890.

The Kelham Rood
On the south side of the nave stands the Kelham Rood, a life-size bronze sculpture of Christ on the Cross together with free-standing figures of St John and the Virgin Mary. It is the work of sculptor Charles Sargeant Jagger (1885–1934), who also designed the Royal Artillery Memorial in London's Hyde Park Corner, and was completed in 1929.

The sculpture was originally commissioned by the Society of the Sacred Mission (SSM) for the Great Chapel at Kelham Hall in Nottinghamshire. The sculpture then stood in the SSM Priory in Willen (Milton Keynes), before being moved to St John the Divine.

The original plan to suspend the sculpture above the high altar was not put into effect. It has, instead, been placed at floor level in full and close view of the congregation (see pictures below).

Worship

Since its foundation in 1871, St John the Divine has been affiliated with the Anglican high church. The second vicar, the Rev. Charles Edward Brooke, was associated with the Oxford Movement and its work in impoverished city parishes. At this time, ritualistic practices in the Church of England were limited by the Public Worship Regulation Act 1874. 

The High Anglican style of worship is reflected in the design and decoration of the church, with the presence of devotional statues, icons, sanctuary lamps and the Reserved sacrament.The high church traditions continue today, and services in this church are generally in the Anglo-Catholic style, with an emphasis on sacraments, liturgy and ceremony. On Sundays and holy days, clergy wear decorated robes, a choir sings the Mass, and incense is used. Through the week, Mass is said daily. The liturgy is usually based on the Common Worship prayer book (2000).

The Sisterhood of St. John the Divine, an Anglican religious order, is indirectly named after this church, for its foundress, Hannah Grier Coome found spiritual comfort in the parish during her residence in Britain.

Notable clergy
 Cyril Easthaugh, curate and vicar; later Bishop of Kensington and of Peterborough
 John Hall, curate; later Dean of Westminster

See also
List of churches and cathedrals of London
List of Anglo-Catholic Churches
British and Irish stained glass (1811–1918)

References

External links

St John the Divine, Kennington
Flickr group "sjdk"
Details of the organ

Churches completed in 1874
19th-century Church of England church buildings
Kennington
Kennington
Gothic Revival church buildings in London
Kennington
Kennington
G. E. Street buildings
Kennington